Pervomaysky is a rural locality (a settlement) in Tolshmenskoye Rural Settlement, Totemsky  District, Vologda Oblast, Russia. The population was 101 as of 2002. There are 5 streets.

Geography 
The distance to Totma is 113 km, to Nikolskoye is 18 km. Golebatovo is the nearest rural locality.

References 

Rural localities in Totemsky District